German submarine U-334 was a Type VIIC U-boat of Nazi Germany's Kriegsmarine during World War II. The submarine was laid down on 16 March 1940 at the Nordseewerke yard at Emden as yard number 206, launched on 15 August 1941 and commissioned on 9 October under the command of Kapitänleutnant Hilmar Siemon.

Design
German Type VIIC submarines were preceded by the shorter Type VIIB submarines. U-334 had a displacement of  when at the surface and  while submerged. She had two shafts and two  propellers.

U-334 was fitted with five  torpedo tubes (four fitted at the bow and one at the stern), fourteen torpedoes, one  SK C/35 naval gun, 220 rounds, and a  C/30 anti-aircraft gun. The boat had a complement of between forty-four and sixty.

Service history
After training with the 8th U-boat Flotilla, she moved to the 3rd flotilla for front-line service in March 1942. She was reassigned to the 11th flotilla in July.

First patrol
U-334s maiden patrol saw the U-boat sail into the Greenland Sea; it was then marred by the loss overboard of 19-year-old Matrosengefreiter Otto Mayerhof in the Barents Sea on 13 April 1942, a day before the submarine docked at Trondheim in Norway.

Second patrol
Her second foray was split into two parts. During the second, longer portion, the boat sank the William Hopper, a former member of the notorious convoy PQ 17 on 4 July 1942. The ship had already been badly damaged in an air attack. In a scuttling attempt, she was fired-on by a British escort vessel, but stubbornly refused to sink. Later that same day, U-334 fired two 'coup de grâce' torpedoes at the ship; the first was defective, the second missed. The wreck was eventually sunk by fire from the boat's deck gun.

The following day (5 July 1942), she sank the Earlston, also a member of the ill-fated convoy. She too, had already been damaged by bombs. U-334 was also subject to attack from the air that day; a Ju 88 damaged the steering gear and rendered the U-boat unable to dive.  was obliged to escort U-334 to Neidenfjord.

She then sailed from Neidenfjord to Trondheim, arriving on 14 July.

Third patrol
Sortie number three took the boat north of Iceland and into the Norwegian Sea, finishing at Narvik.

Fourth patrol and loss
Following short trips from Narvik to Trondheim and Trondheim to Bergen, the submarine commenced her fourth patrol from Bergen on 5 June 1943. She passed through the gap between Iceland and the Faroe Islands.

Forty-seven men died; there were no survivors.

Wolfpacks
U-334 took part in three wolfpacks, namely:
 Naseweis (31 March – 10 April 1942) 
 Bums (10 – 12 April 1942) 
 Eisteufel (21 June – 5 July 1942)

Summary of raiding history

References

Bibliography

External links
 

German Type VIIC submarines
U-boats commissioned in 1941
U-boats sunk in 1943
World War II submarines of Germany
World War II shipwrecks in the Atlantic Ocean
U-boats sunk by depth charges
U-boats sunk by British warships
1942 ships
Ships built in Emden
Ships lost with all hands
Maritime incidents in June 1943